Arghyakamal Mitra is an Indian film editor who primarily works in Bengali films. He collaborated with some acclaimed directors like Aparna Sen, Rituparno Ghosh, Aniruddha Roy Chowdhury, Suman Mukhopadhyay, Anjan Dutta, Anik Dutta, Soukarya Ghosal and Bauddhayan Mukherji. He has won the National Film Award for Best Editing for his work in Rituparno Ghosh's film Abohomaan.

Filmography

As film editor

Awards
 Bangladesh National Film Award for Best Editing - Aha!
 National Film Award for Best Editing - Abohomaan

References

Living people
Bengali film editors
Year of birth missing (living people)